Jan Belle (fl. 1545 - 1566) was a Flemish composer from the Franco-Flemish School and a music theorist.

Live
Between 1546 and 1547, Belle was a magister duodenorum (master of the choirboys) at the Holy Cross Church in Liège. He was referred to as 'de Lovanium' which indicates that he was originally from Leuven.  He may also have been a Kapellmeister (succentor) at the Church of Our Lady in Sint-Truiden.

Works
Jan Belle was a composer as well as a music theorist.

In 1552, the publisher and editor Jacob Bathen, who lived in Maastricht, published Belle’s probable first work relating to music. This was the Musices encomion, a book on music theory.   No copies of the book have been preserved.

In 1572, Petrus Phalesius the Elder in Leuven and Johannes Bellerus in Antwerp jointly published under the title Een Duytsch musyck boeck an anthology of Dutch songs by various composers. The book contains six songs for four voices composed by Belle. These songs are:

Fluer van alle vrouwen soet (Flower of all sweet women)
Ick en can mij niet bedwinghen (I cannot control myself) (In a 1554 edition by Jacob Bathen, this song is credited to Joannes Zacheus)
Int groen, int groen, met u alderliefste (In the green, in the green, with you, my sweetest)
Laet ons nu al verblijden in desen soeten tijt (Let us already rejoice in this sweet time)
O amoureusich mondeken root (Oh enamored red mouth)
O doloreux herte met druck beladich (Oh aching heart weighed down with pressure)

References 

16th-century Franco-Flemish composers
Year of death unknown
Year of birth unknown
Flemish composers
Flemish music theorists